Waldo Emerson Bishop (January 14, 1915 – January 30, 1990) was an American politician in the state of Florida and a Democrat.

He served in the Florida State Senate from 1956 to 1957 and 1968 to 1972 as a Democratic member for the 14th district (first term) and 6th district (second term). He also served briefly in the Florida House of Representatives in 1957.

References

1915 births
1990 deaths
Democratic Party members of the Florida House of Representatives
Democratic Party Florida state senators
Pork Chop Gang
20th-century American politicians